Hypersport, hyper sport, or, variation, may refer to:

 Hyper sport bike or hyper sport, a type of sport bike motorcycle
 Lykan HyperSport, a Lebanese sports car
 Hyper sport – car racing category, a sports car category that includes the race class Le Mans Hypercar
 Hyper Sport Racing, a sports car race team that contracted operations from Multimatic Motorsports

See also

 Hypercar (disambiguation)
 Super sport (disambiguation)
 Ultra sport (disambiguation)
 Megasport (disambiguation)
 Hyper (disambiguation)
 Sport (disambiguation)